Nebria jeffreyi is a species of ground beetle in the Nebriinae subfamily that is endemic to US state of Oregon.

References

jeffreyi
Beetles described in 1984
Beetles of North America
Endemic fauna of Oregon